Kenneth Edward "Eddie" London (born July 31, 1956 in Dreux, France) is a country music singer. Signed to RCA Nashville in 1991, he released the album Do It Right that year. This album produced the single "If We Can't Do It Right", which peaked at number 41 on the U.S. country singles charts and is his only chart entry.  Eddie is currently a tour bus driver for touring musicians.

Biography
Kenneth Edward London was born in Dreux, France to a military family, but lived in Syracuse, New York. He later moved to Nashville, Tennessee, working as a demo singer and session bass guitarist, playing for Kitty Wells and Red Sovine, among others.

In 1991, London signed to RCA Records Nashville to release his debut album Do It Right and its single, "If We Can't Do It Right", which peaked at number 41 on the Billboard Hot Country Songs charts. Ken Rosenbaum of the Toledo Blade described the album as "30 minutes of mediocrity," and an uncredited review in the Miami Herald called it "sweeter than molasses dripping over a bowl of Fruit Loops. And just as repugnant." The album was produced by Ronnie Rogers (who also wrote several of the songs on it) and Warren Peterson. Its only other single, "Uninvited Memory," did not chart.

Do It Right (1991)

"Wakin' with the Blues" (Ronnie Rogers) – 2:45
"If We Can't Do It Right" (Rogers, Mark Wright) – 3:24
"I Wouldn't Change a Thing About You but Your Name" (Rick West, Bob Moulds, David Wills) – 2:50
"Uninvited Memory" (Will Robinson, Larry Boone, John Greenebaum) – 3:57
"Leave My Country Alone" (Rogers, Ron Peterson) – 2:28
"Up on a Stool Feelin' Down" (Rogers) – 3:05
"Only a Fool Would Know" (Rogers) – 2:43
"Rowdy Road" (Rogers) – 4:07
"My Love Belongs to You" (Rogers) – 3:36
"Business as Usual" (Dennis Adkins) – 4:59

Personnel
As listed in liner notes.
Bobby All – acoustic guitar
Costo Davis – synthesizer
Glen Duncan – fiddle
Sonny Garrish – steel guitar
Steve Gibson – electric guitar, acoustic guitar
Owen Hale – drums
David Hungate – bass guitar
Jana King – background vocals
Mike Lawler – synthesizer
Larrie Londin – drums
Weldon Myrick – steel guitar
Donna Rhodes – background vocals
Perry Rhodes – background vocals
Hargus "Pig" Robbins – piano, synthesizer
Brent Rowan – electric guitar
Lisa Silver – background vocals
D. Bergen White – background vocals
Bob Wray – bass guitar
Reggie Young – electric guitar

Strings performed by the Nashville String Machine, arranged by D. Bergen White, contracted by Carl Gorodetzky.

Additional background vocals on "Business as Usual" by "The Happen-To-Bes": Mary McCarthy, Teddy Gentry, Dale Morris, Jack Weston, Roger Sovine, Harry Warner, Ronnie Rogers, Warren Peterson, Greg Fowler.

Singles

References

1956 births
American country bass guitarists
American country singer-songwriters
American male singer-songwriters
RCA Records Nashville artists
Living people
Musicians from Syracuse, New York
Singer-songwriters from New York (state)
Guitarists from New York (state)
American male bass guitarists
20th-century American bass guitarists
Country musicians from New York (state)
20th-century American male musicians